The 1996 Hellmann's Cup was a men's tennis tournament played on outdoor clay courts in Santiago in Chile that was part of the World Series of the 1996 ATP Tour. It was the fourth edition of the tournament and ran from 4 November through 10 November 1996. Fourth-seeded Hernán Gumy won the singles title.

Finals

Singles

 Hernán Gumy defeated  Marcelo Ríos 6–4, 7–5
 It was Gumy's only title of the year and the 1st of his career.

Doubles

 Gustavo Kuerten /  Fernando Meligeni defeated  Dinu Pescariu /  Albert Portas 6–4, 6–2
 It was Kuerten's only title of the year and the 1st of his career. It was Meligeni's 2nd title of the year and the 3rd of his career.

References

External links
 ITF tournament edition details
 ATP tournament profile

Hellmann's Cup
Chile Open (tennis)
Hellmann's Cup